Donald Curry is a former boxer.

Donald Curry may also refer to:

Don Curry, actor and comedian
Donald Curry, Baron Curry of Kirkharle, businessman and member of House of Lords
Don Curry (baseball), played in 1941 Chicago Cubs season
Don Curry (basketball) in Atlanta Hawks draft history

See also
Donald Currie (disambiguation)
Donald Rusk Currey, American professor of geography